Dysbatus stenodesma is a moth of the family Geometridae first described by Oswald Bertram Lower in 1899. It is found in Australia.

References

Nacophorini